

St. Augustine, Florida/St. Johns County, Florida Parks

External links
 St. Augustine/St.Johns County Recreation website

St. Augustine
Parks in Florida
Parks in St. Johns County, Florida
Parks